Meridarchis wufengensis is a moth in the Carposinidae family. It is found in China.

References

Natural History Museum Lepidoptera generic names catalog

Carposinidae